This is a list of works by or featuring David John Moore Cornwell, a British author better known by his pseudonym John le Carré. It also includes a list of film, television, and radio adaptations of le Carré's writing.

Novels 
 Call for the Dead (1961), 
 A Murder of Quality (1962), 
 The Spy Who Came in from the Cold (1963), 
 The Looking Glass War (1965), 
 A Small Town in Germany (1968), 
 The Naïve and Sentimental Lover (1971), 
 Tinker Tailor Soldier Spy (1974), 
 The Honourable Schoolboy (1977), 
 Smiley's People (1979), 
 The Little Drummer Girl (1983), 
 A Perfect Spy (1986), 
 The Russia House (1989), 
 The Secret Pilgrim (1990), 
 The Night Manager (1993), 
 Our Game (1995), 
 The Tailor of Panama (1996), 
 Single & Single (1999), 
 The Constant Gardener (2001), 
 Absolute Friends (2003), 
 The Mission Song (2006), 
 A Most Wanted Man (2008), 
 Our Kind of Traitor (2010), 
 A Delicate Truth (2013), 
 A Legacy of Spies (2017), 
 Agent Running in the Field (2019), 
 Silverview (2021),  (posthumous publication)

George Smiley omnibus volumes 
 The Incongruous Spy (1964), containing Call for the Dead and A Murder of Quality, 
 The Quest for Karla (1982), containing Tinker Tailor Soldier Spy, The Honourable Schoolboy and Smiley's People (republished in 1995 as Smiley Versus Karla in the UK; and John Le Carré: Three Complete Novels in the U.S.),

Short stories 
 "Dare I Weep, Dare I Mourn?" (1967), in Saturday Evening Post, 28 January 1967
 "What Ritual is Being Observed Tonight?" (1968), in Saturday Evening Post, 2 November 1968
 "The Writer and the Horse" (published in the US as "A Writer and A Gentleman") (1968), in The Savile Club Centenary Magazine and later in The Argosy and The Saturday Review (November 30, 1968)
 "The King Who Never Spoke" (2009), in Ox-Tales: Fire, 2 July 2009

Non-fiction 
 The Good Soldier (1991), collected in Granta 35: The Unbearable Peace
 The United States Has Gone Mad (2003), collected in Not One More Death (2006), 
 Afterword (2014), an essay on Kim Philby, published in A Spy Among Friends by Ben Macintyre
 The Pigeon Tunnel: Stories from My Life (2016), 
 A Private Spy: The Letters of John le Carré 1945-2020 (2022),

Film

Screenplays 
Source(s):
 End of the Line (1970)
 Smiley's People (1982) with John Hopkins  
 A Murder of Quality (1991)
 The Tailor of Panama (2001), with John Boorman and Andrew Davies

Executive producer 
Source(s):
 The Tailor of Panama (2001)
 Tinker Tailor Soldier Spy (2011)
 A Most Wanted Man (2014)
 The Night Manager (2016)
 Our Kind of Traitor (2016)
 The Little Drummer Girl (2018)

Actor 
Source(s):
 The Little Drummer Girl (1984), as David Cornwell
 Tinker Tailor Soldier Spy (2011), as John le Carré

 The Night Manager (2016), as David Cornwell
 The Little Drummer Girl (2018)

Adaptations
After many years of working with various producers who made film adaptations of his novels, two of Cornwell's sons, Simon and Stephen, founded the production company The Ink Factory in 2010. This was to produce adaptations of his works as well as other film productions. The Ink Factory has produced the films A Most Wanted Man and Our Kind of Traitor, and the TV series The Night Manager and The Little Drummer Girl.

Film
Source(s):
 The Spy Who Came in from the Cold (1965), directed by Martin Ritt, with Richard Burton as the protagonist, Alec Leamas
 The Deadly Affair (1967), an adaptation of Call for the Dead, directed by Sidney Lumet, with James Mason as Charles Dobbs (George Smiley in the novel)
 The Looking Glass War (1970), directed by Frank Pierson, with Anthony Hopkins as Avery, Christopher Jones as Leiser, and Sir Ralph Richardson as LeClerc
 The Little Drummer Girl (1984), directed by George Roy Hill, with Diane Keaton as Charlie
 The Russia House (1990), directed by Fred Schepisi, with Sean Connery as Barley Blair
 The Tailor of Panama (2001), directed by John Boorman, with Pierce Brosnan as Andy Osnard, a disgraced spy, and Geoffrey Rush as the emigre English tailor Harry Pendel
 The Constant Gardener (2005), directed by Fernando Meirelles, with Ralph Fiennes as Justin Quayle, set in the slums in Kibera and Loiyangalani, Kenya; the poverty so affected the film crew that they established the Constant Gardener Trust to provide basic education to those areas (John le Carré was a patron of the charity)
 Tinker Tailor Soldier Spy (2011), directed by Tomas Alfredson and starring Gary Oldman as George Smiley
 A Most Wanted Man (2014), directed by Anton Corbijn and starring Philip Seymour Hoffman
 Our Kind of Traitor (2016), directed by Susanna White and starring Ewan McGregor

Radio
 The Russia House (1994), BBC Radio 4, featuring Tom Baker as Barley Blair
 The Complete Smiley (2009–2010) BBC Radio 4, an eight-part radio-play series, based on the novels featuring George Smiley, commencing with Call for the Dead, broadcast on 23 May 2009, with Simon Russell Beale as George Smiley, and concluding with The Secret Pilgrim in June 2010
 A Delicate Truth (May 2013), BBC Radio 4's Book at Bedtime, recorded by Damian Lewis
 Abridged excerpts from The Pigeon Tunnel, broadcast as BBC Radio 4's Book of the Week, commencing on 12 September 2016

Television
Source(s):
 Tinker Tailor Soldier Spy (1979), BBC seven-part television series, with Alec Guinness as George Smiley
 Smiley's People (1982), BBC television series, with Alec Guinness as George Smiley
 A Perfect Spy (1987), BBC television adaptation directed by Peter Smith, with Peter Egan as Magnus Pym and Ray McAnally as Rick
 A Murder of Quality (1991), Thames Television adaptation directed by Gavin Millar, with Denholm Elliott as George Smiley and Joss Ackland as Terence Fielding
 The Night Manager (2016), BBC and AMC series, adapted by screenwriter David Farr and directed by Susanne Bier, with Tom Hiddleston as Jonathan Pine and Hugh Laurie as Richard Onslow Roper
 The Little Drummer Girl (2018), BBC and AMC series, directed by Park Chan-wook, with Michael Shannon as Martin Kurtz, Alexander Skarsgård as Gadi Becker and Florence Pugh as Charlie Ross

References 

John le Carré
Le Carre, John